Jeffrey Vincent Brown (born March 27, 1970) is a United States district judge for the United States District Court for the Southern District of Texas and a former associate justice of the Texas Supreme Court. He was appointed to the U.S. district court by President Donald Trump.

Early life and education 
Brown's father was a police officer. In 1988, Brown graduated from Bishop Lynch High School in Dallas, Texas. He earned his bachelor's degree in English from the University of Texas and his Juris Doctor degree from the University of Houston Law Center, at which he served as one of the editors of the Houston Law Review. He served as a law clerk to Texas Supreme Court Justices Jack Hightower and Greg Abbott, the subsequent governor of Texas. He became certified in civil trial law and practiced with the Houston firm of Baker Botts L.L.P.

Judicial career 
From 2007 to 2013, he was a justice on Houston's 14th Court of Appeals. Prior to that, he was the judge of the 55th Texas State District Court.

Brown ran unsuccessfully for the Place 3 position on the Texas Supreme Court in the 2010 Republican primary. He finished in fifth place with 188,238 votes (16.8 percent). Brown ran in a 2014 special election in order to keep his position on the Texas Supreme Court. In the Republican primary election held on March 4, 2014, Brown defeated an intraparty challenge from Joe Richard Pool Jr., son of the late U.S. Representative Joe R. Pool, who in the 1960s held Texas' 3rd congressional district seat. Brown received 820,582 votes (71.9 percent) to Pool's 320,558 (28.1 percent). In the November 4, 2014, general election, Brown defeated the Republican-turned-Democrat Lawrence E. Meyers. Brown polled 2,772,056 votes (60.3 percent) to Meyers's 1,677,341 (36.5 percent). Another 146,511 votes (3.2 percent) went to the Libertarian Party nominee, Mark Ash. Brown won election to a full term on the Texas Supreme Court in 2018. With 4,388,052 votes (53.7 percent), he defeated Democrat Kathy Cheng, who polled 3,777,468 (46.3 percent).

His service on the Texas Supreme Court ended on September 4, 2019, when he was commissioned as a federal district judge.

Federal judicial service 

On March 8, 2019, President Donald Trump announced his intent to nominate Brown to serve as a United States district judge of the United States District Court for the Southern District of Texas. On March 11, 2019, President Trump nominated Brown to the seat vacated by Judge Melinda Harmon, who assumed senior status on March 31, 2018. On April 10, 2019, a hearing on his nomination was held before the Senate Judiciary Committee. On May 9, 2019, his nomination was reported out of committee by a 12–10 vote. On July 30, 2019, the Senate voted 51–37 to invoke cloture on his nomination. On July 31, 2019, his nomination was confirmed by a 50–40 vote. He received his judicial commission on September 4, 2019. He was sworn into office on September 11, 2019.

In January 2022, Brown enjoined enforcement of a COVID-19 vaccine mandate for federal employees that President Biden's administration had implemented. Noting his belief that people should get vaccinated against COVID-19, Brown explained that the case turned on the question of "whether the President can, with the stroke of a pen and without the input of Congress, require millions of federal employees to undergo a medical procedure as a condition of their employment."  In April 2022, a three-judge panel of the United States Court of Appeals for the Fifth Circuit vacated Judge Brown's ruling and instructed him to dismiss the case, but in June a majority of active Fifth Circuit judges voted to rehear the cause en banc, thereby vacating the April panel opinion.

Personal life 
Brown and his wife, Susannah, a former schoolteacher, have three children. They  reside in Galveston.

In 2016, he was awarded the Outstanding Eagle Scout Award by the National Eagle Scout Association.

See also 
 List of justices of the Texas Supreme Court

References

External links 
 
 Texas Supreme Court Profile (archive)

|-

1970 births
Living people
21st-century American judges
American United Methodists
Businesspeople from Texas
Judges of the United States District Court for the Southern District of Texas
Justices of the Texas Supreme Court
People associated with Baker Botts
People from Dallas
People from Houston
People from Kyle, Texas
Texas lawyers
Texas Republicans
United States district court judges appointed by Donald Trump
University of Texas alumni
University of Houston Law Center alumni